is a Shingon temple in Sanuki, Kagawa Prefecture, Japan. It is Temple 88 on the Shikoku 88 temple pilgrimage. Pilgrims leave their kongō-zue at the temple when completing the circuit. The Ōkubo-ji temple bell and pilgrim bells have been selected by the Ministry of the Environment as one of the 100 Soundscapes of Japan.

See also

 Shikoku 88 temple pilgrimage
 100 Soundscapes of Japan

References

Buddhist temples in Kagawa Prefecture
Shingon Buddhism
Buddhist pilgrimage sites in Japan